Kanakakkunnu Palace is situated in Thiruvananthapuram near the Napier museum, India.
It is India's first digital garden, created by Akhilesh S. V. Nair and A. Gangaprasad, University of Kerala, Department of Botany.

Today the palace and its sprawling grounds are the venue for many cultural meetings and programmes. An all India Dance Festival (October - March) is organised by the Department of Tourism every year. During this period the classical Indian Dance performances are conducted every day. There are many tourists streaming from foreign countries every year.

History
It is said to be built by Sree Moolam Thirunal. In the past It has been later used by the Travancore royal family to entertain its guests and serve non vegetarian food as the royal family was vegetarian. It is now protected by the tourism department the palace plays host to a lot of cultural meets and programs. The Indian National Trust for Art and Cultural Heritage (INTACH) has listed this place as a heritage monument.

Details
Located about 800 meters north east of the Napier Museum in the heart of Trivandrum city, Kanakakunnu Palace is one of the last architectural vestiges of the colonial era. Built during the reign of Travancore king Sree Moolam Thirunal (1885−1924) with the help of Viswabrahmin, the palace served as the main venue for royal banquets. Later Chithira Thirunal, one of Travancore’s popular rulers, refurbished the palace and constructed tennis courts in the premises. He also did use it for a few years as a summer retreat. Boasting a Kerala style facade, the Travancore royal family used the house to entertain guests. Inside you will see massive crystal chandeliers and an array of exquisite pieces of royal furniture – a testimony to the lavish lifestyle of the Thirunal kings who had a penchant for music and art. Add to it a picturesque setting on the crest of a small hill lush with meadows, grooves and flowering shrubs.

Now under the Kerala government’s wing, the palace complex walls-in the Nishagandhi open-air auditorium and Sooryakanthi auditorium. A popular haunt of culture vultures in the city, the auditoriums are the venues for various cultural meets and programs. The prestigious All India Dance Festival aka Nishagandhi festival is hosted annually by the Department of Tourism at the Nishagandhi open-air auditorium. Indian classical dance exponents from across the country come down to participate in the festival.

Prominent events

References

Palaces in Thiruvananthapuram